Robert Alberto Arias Sancho (born 16 March 1980 in Costa Rica) is a Costa Rican retired footballer.

Career

Arias started his career with Herediano, playing for them until 2011 despite offers from Alajuelense and Saprissa, the most successful team in Costa Rica.

While coaching Suchitepéquez in Guatemala, he claimed it was impossible to win in an away game against Sololá, due to death threats and the referee's bias.

Personal life
Arias' nephew, Aarón Salazar, is also a professional footballer.

References

External links

1980 births
Living people
People from Heredia (canton)
Costa Rican footballers
Costa Rica international footballers
Association football defenders
C.S. Herediano footballers
Costa Rican expatriate footballers
Costa Rican expatriate sportspeople in Guatemala
Expatriate footballers in Guatemala